David L. Lopez was a prominent builder, industrialist, slave owner, and defender of the Confederacy who lived in Charleston, South Carolina.

Life 
Lopez was born on January 16, 1809, into a religiously observant Sephardi Jewish family of Portuguese descent. The Lopez family were shomer Shabbat, belonging to the traditionalist factor of Kahal Kadosh Beth Elohim. Lopez was one of twelve siblings. David Lopez Sr. (1750–1812) died two years after his son was born. Lopez Jr. was raised by his mother, Priscilla Moses Lopez (1775–1866), as well as by his siblings and enslaved African-Americans owned by the Lopez family. Legally, Lopez became a slave owner at age 2, because his father's will "bequeath[ed] in Manner aforesaid My Negro Boy Named Mathew (the Child of Nancy) and also two Union Bank Shares..." Lopez's paternal half-uncle was Aaron Lopez, a wealthy merchant, slave trader, and philanthropist in Rhode Island.

Career and legacy 
The Kahal Kadosh Beth Elohim synagogue in Charleston, South Carolina, was constructed by enslaved Black people owned by Lopez. In 2020, a monument was installed with an inscription at the site of the synagogue, to commemorate the forced human labor extracted from Black Africans owned by Lopez in the construction of the site, as well as the cleaning of silver casings used to contain the Torah scroll; In acknowledging the past injustice, Rabbi Stephanie Alexander says "We're being honest and transparent about what has enabled us to come together and has enabled us to come to this space."

See also 
 History of the Jews in Charleston, South Carolina

References

External links 

 

1809 births
1884 deaths
American Orthodox Jews
American people of Portuguese-Jewish descent
American Sephardic Jews
Burials at Coming Street Cemetery
American businesspeople
Hispanic and Latino American slave owners
Jewish-American slave owners
Jewish Confederates